Sir Nigel Richard Shadbolt  (born 9 April 1956) is Principal of Jesus College, Oxford, and Professorial Research Fellow in the Department of Computer Science, University of Oxford. He is Chairman of the Open Data Institute which he co-founded with Tim Berners-Lee. He is also a Visiting Professor in the School of Electronics and Computer Science at the University of Southampton. Shadbolt is an interdisciplinary researcher, policy expert and commentator. His research focuses on understanding how intelligent behaviour is embodied and emerges in humans, machines and, most recently, on the Web, and has made contributions to the fields of Psychology, Cognitive science, Computational neuroscience, Artificial Intelligence (AI), Computer science and the emerging field of Web science.

Education
Shadbolt was born in London but adopted and raised in the Derbyshire village of Ashford-in-the-Water, living a "bucolic existence" until he went to university. He went to Lady Manners School, then a grammar school. He obtained an undergraduate degree in philosophy and psychology at Newcastle University. His PhD degree was received from the Department of Artificial Intelligence at the University of Edinburgh. His thesis resulted in a framework for understanding how human dialogue is organised and was supervised by Barry Richards and Henry S. Thompson.

Research and career
Shadbolt's research has been in Artificial Intelligence since the late 1970s working on a broad range of topics; from natural language understanding and robotics through to expert systems, computational neuroscience, memory through to the semantic web and linked data. He also writes on the wider implications of his research. One example is the book he co-authored with Kieron O'Hara that examines privacy and trust in the Digital Age – The Spy in the Coffee Machine. His most recent research is on the topic of social machines – understanding the emergent problem solving that arises from a combination of humans, computers and data at web scale. The SOCIAM project on social machines is funded by the Engineering and Physical Sciences Research Council (EPSRC).

In 1983, Shadbolt moved to the University of Nottingham and joined the Department of Psychology. From 2000 to 2015 he was Professor of Artificial Intelligence in the School of Electronics and Computer Science at the University of Southampton.

From 2000 to 2007, he led and directed the Advanced Knowledge Technologies (AKT) Interdisciplinary Research Collaboration (IRC). It produced a broad range of Semantic Web research, including how diverse information could be harvested and integrated and how semantics could help computers systems recommend content.

In 2006 Shadbolt was elected a Fellow of the Royal Academy of Engineering (FREng). He is a Fellow of the British Computer Society (FBCS) and was its President in its 50th jubilee year. That same year, Nigel Shadbolt, Tim Berners-Lee, Wendy Hall and Daniel Weitzner, founded the Web Science Research Initiative, to promote the discipline of Web Science and foster research collaboration between the University of Southampton and Massachusetts Institute of Technology.

From 2007 to 2011 Shadbolt was Deputy Head of the School of Electronics and Computer Science (ECS) at the University of Southampton, from 2011 to 2014 he was Head of the Web and Internet Science Group, the first research group dedicated to the study of Web science and Internet science, within ECS, comprising 140 staff, researchers and PhD students.

His Semantic Web research led to the formation of Garlik, offering identity protection services. In 2008, Garlik was awarded Technology Pioneer status by the Davos World Economic Forum and won the UK BT Flagship IT Award.  Experian acquired Garlik in November 2011.

In June 2009 he was appointed together with Tim Berners-Lee as Information Advisor to the UK Government. The two led a team to develop data.gov.uk, a single point of access for UK non-personal Governmental public data. In May 2010 he was appointed by the UK Coalition Government to the Public Sector Transparency Board responsible for setting open data standards across the public sector and developing the legal Right to Data.

In December 2012, Shadbolt and Tim Berners-Lee formally launched the Open Data Institute. The ODI focuses on incubating and nurturing new businesses wanting to harness open data, training and promoting standards. In 2013, Shadbolt and Tim Berners-Lee joined the board of advisors of tech startup State.com, creating a network of structured opinions on the semantic web. On 1 August 2015 he was appointed Principal of Jesus College, Oxford and a Professorial Research Fellow in the Department of Computer Science, University of Oxford.

Appointments 

 2008–present: Director, Web Science Trust 
 2010–2015: Chair of Local Public Data Panel, Dept. of Communities and Local Government. 
 2011–2014: Chair of UK Midata programme, BIS, appointed by Minister of State
 2012–2016: UK Health Sector Transparency Board, DHS.
 2013–2015: UK Research Sector Transparency Board, appointed by Minister of State
 2013–2015: UK Information Economy Council, BIS, appointed by Minister of State
 2015–2016: Chair, Shadbolt Review of Computer Science Employability
 2015–2016: UK French Data Task Force, appointed by Chancellor of Exchequer
 2015–present: Member, HMG Digital Advisory Board. Appointed by Minister of State

Awards and honours 

 
 
 
 
 
 
 
 
 2014: Appointed EPSRC RISE (Recognising Inspirational Scientists and Engineers) Fellow
 2016: Elected first Jisc Fellow
 2017: Elected Fellow of the Royal Society (FRS)

He was interviewed by Jim Al-Khalili on The Life Scientific on BBC Radio 4 in April 2015. In 2016, he delivered the Hinton Lecture of the Royal Academy of Engineering, entitled "Engineering the Future of Data".

Personal life 
Shadbolt is married to Bev Saunders, a designer, and has two children.

Bibliography 

 Shadbolt, Nigel and Hampson, Roger (2018), The Digital Ape, Scribe Publications, London, UK

References 

1956 births
Living people
Scientists from London
Alumni of Newcastle University
Alumni of the University of Edinburgh
English computer scientists
Academics of the University of Nottingham
Academics of the University of Southampton
Fellows of the British Computer Society
Fellows of the Royal Academy of Engineering
Knights Bachelor
Presidents of the British Computer Society
Principals of Jesus College, Oxford
Members of the Department of Computer Science, University of Oxford
Semantic Web people
Fellows of the Royal Society